Udayana may refer to:
 Udayana
 Udayana (king)
 Udayana Kirindigoda, Sri Lankan politician
 Udayana Warmadewa